"Inside Out" is a song by Canadian singer Bryan Adams from his album On a Day Like Today (1998). It is also featured on his greatest hits album The Best of Me. On some versions of this album, the song "Don't Give Up" with Chicane was added as a ghost track right after "Inside Out".

It was released as a single in 2000. The single included live versions of "Back to You" and "Rock Steady", recorded in South Africa, taken from the special edition release of "The Best of Me". There is a music video of the single, with the cover model as a robot. She also appears in one of Adams' photography books.

Charts

Trisha Yearwood and Don Henley version

American country music artist Trisha Yearwood recorded the song as a duet with Don Henley for her 2001 album of the same name. Yearwood's and Henley's version (their second collaboration after "Walkaway Joe") was a #31-peaking single on the U.S. country singles charts that year.

Charts

References

2000 singles
2001 singles
2000 songs
Bryan Adams songs
Trisha Yearwood songs
Don Henley songs
Male–female vocal duets
Songs written by Bryan Adams
Songs written by Gretchen Peters
A&M Records singles
MCA Nashville Records singles
Song recordings produced by Mark Wright (record producer)
Song recordings produced by Bob Rock